Azle is a city west of Fort Worth in Parker and Tarrant Counties in the U.S. state of Texas. As of the 2010 census, the city population was 10,947.

Azle is the home of the Azle Marching Green Pride marching band and the Fighting Azle Hornets.

Geography

History
The first recorded settlement at the site occurred in 1846, when James Azle Steward, a young doctor, moved into a log cabin built by a Dutchman named Rumsfeldt. Other settlers came and established themselves near the local streams, Ash Creek, Silver Creek, and Walnut Creek. Steward helped establish the first cemetery, Ash Creek. The oldest graves there are those of Dave Morrison (1849–1874) and W. P. Gregg (1833–1874). The first post office opened in 1881, and the town took the name of O'Bar, in honor of the man who obtained the postal service. A short time later in 1883, the name was changed to Azle at the request of Steward, who donated the land for a townsite. The community's economy was based on agriculture. Several crops were grown, including wheat, corn, peanuts, sorghum, and cotton. Watermelons, cantaloupes, peaches, plums, and pears were also produced. Dairy farming became important in the early decades of the 20th century, when local milk products were sold to creameries in Fort Worth. Azle's population grew steadily, and by 1920, the census recorded 150 residents. By 1933, State Highway 34 (later State Highway 199) had reached Azle from Fort Worth, greatly improving transportation between the town and the city. Also, Eagle Mountain Lake was formed by a dam on the Trinity River, east of Azle.

In the late 1930s, electricity was supplied to Azle and the surrounding countryside. The population grew between 1940 and 1960 from 800 to 2,696. It was 5,822 by 1980. After the 1930s, agriculture gradually declined; fields were converted from wheat and corn production to housing developments. Manufacturing increased, and in 1984, Azle had 26 businesses. In 1985, the population was estimated at more than 7,000. In 1990, the population was 8,868. It grew to 9,600 by 2000.

Demographics

2020 census

As of the 2020 United States census, there were 13,369 people, 4,705 households, and 3,499 families residing in the city.

2000 census
As of the census of 2000, 9,600 people, 3,716 households, and 2,701 families resided in the city. The population density was 1,170.8 people per square mile (452.0/km2). The 3,957 housing units averaged 482.6 per square mile (186.3/km2). The racial makeup of the city was 95.90% White, 0.22% African American, 0.66% Native American, 0.51% Asian, 0.02% Pacific Islander, 1.41% from other races, and 1.29% from two or more races. Hispanics or Latinos of any race were 4.20% of the population.

Of the 3,716 households, 35.3% had children under the age of 18 living with them, 57.5% were married couples living together, 11.2% had a female householder with no husband present, and 27.3% were not families. About 24.0% of all households were made up of individuals, and 10.1% had someone living alone who was 65 years of age or older. The average household size was 2.54 and the average family size was 3.00.

In the city, the population was distributed as 26.3% under the age of 18, 7.8% from 18 to 24, 29.3% from 25 to 44, 23.7% from 45 to 64, and 12.8% who were 65 years of age or older. The median age was 37 years. For every 100 females, there were 92.2 males. For every 100 females age 18 and over, there were 88.1 males.

The median income for a household in the city was $43,304, and for a family was $51,660. Males had a median income of $37,522 versus $26,998 for females. The per capita income for the city was $20,817. About 6.9% of families and 9.1% of the population were below the poverty line, including 11.0% of those under age 18 and 13.3% of those age 65 or over.

Economy

Top employers
According to Azle's 2014 Comprehensive Annual Financial Report, the top employers in the city are:

Education

The City of Azle is served by the Azle Independent School District. The Azle High School Math/Science and Journalism teams combined won the 2005 UIL State Academic Meet championship with a total of 110 points.  In 2003, 2007, and 2009, the Marching Green Pride band of Azle directed by Dr. Ross Grant advanced to the State Marching competition in San Antonio. In November 2011, the Marching Green Pride, under the direction of Shawn Murphy, placed 18th out of 244 4A marching bands in the state of Texas. In 2013, the Marching Green Pride placed 13th out of the same category.

Schools:
Azle HIgh School
Santo J. Forte Junior High
Azle Junior High
W.E. Hoover Elementary (5–6)
Azle Elementary (Rock School) (5–6)
Walnut Creek Elementary
Liberty Elementary
Silver Creek Elementary
Eagle Heights Elementary
Cross Timbers Elementary

Notable people
John Atwell, NASCAR driver
James Casey (American football)
Andrew Greer, musician
Stephanie Klick, member of the Texas House of Representatives from District 91, formerly resided in Azle; since, Fort Worth 
Robert Landers, Senior PGA golfer
Marcus Luttrell, Navy SEAL, Author, lived in Azle for a few years as a boy
Ken Maddox, California politician, Azle High School alumnus
Les Peden, American baseball player
James Reasoner, author of over 150 Westerns
Jon Shirley, President of Microsoft Corporation
Chas Skelly, UFC Fighter
Red Steagall, American actor, musician, poet, and stage performer, had a ranch outside Azle.
Shelbi Vaughan, Olympic discus thrower
John T. Walker, USMC Lieutenant General

References

External links
 City of Azle official website
 Local Paper: Azle News

Dallas–Fort Worth metroplex
Cities in Texas
Cities in Parker County, Texas
Populated places established in 1846
1846 establishments in Texas